This is a list of programs broadcast by MSNBC. MSNBC is an American news cable and satellite television network that provides news coverage and political commentary from NBC News on current events. The network, which was founded as a partnership between Microsoft and General Electric's NBC unit (which is now the Comcast-owned NBCUniversal), was launched on July 15, 1996.

Current programming

Weekday programs

Weekend programs

MSNBC on Peacock programs

Special

Dateline Extra
MSNBC Documentaries

Former programming

Weekday programs

The Abrams Report
Alan Keyes Is Making Sense
Buchanan & Press
Connected: Coast to Coast
Countdown with Keith Olbermann
The Cycle
Donahue
Dr. Nancy
The Dylan Ratigan Show 
The Ed Show
For the Record with Greta
Hardball with Chris Matthews
Imus in the Morning
Jansing and Company
Martin Bashir
Morning Joe First Look
The Most with Alison Stewart
MSNBC at the Movies
MTP Daily (moved to NBC News NOW)
The News with Brian Williams
Now with Alex Wagner
Race for the White House
The Reid Report
Rita Cosby: Live & Direct
Ronan Farrow Daily
The Savage Nation
Scarborough Country
The Site
Time and Again
Tucker
Up Late with Alec Baldwin
Verdict with Dan Abrams
With All Due Respect

Weekend programs

AM Joy
Disrupt with Karen Finney
Hugh Hewitt
Jesse Ventura's America
Kasie DC
LockupMelissa Harris-PerrySaturday Night Politics with Donny DeutschTaking the HillThe Week with Joshua JohnsonUp with David GuraWeekends with Maury and Connie''

See also

 History of MSNBC: 1996-2007
 History of MSNBC: 2008-2015
 MSNBC Live Streaming

References

Lists of television series by network